Geojilmi of Geumgwan Gaya (died 346, r. 291–346) was the fourth ruler of Geumgwan Gaya, a Gaya state of ancient Korea.  He was the son of King Mapum and Queen Hogu.

Family
Father: King Mapum (마품왕, 麻/馬品王)
Mother: Lady Hogu (호구부인, 好仇夫人)
Wife: Lady Aji (아지부인, 阿志夫人) – granddaughter of an agan named Agung.
Son: King Ipum (이시품왕, 伊尸品王)

See also 
 List of Korean monarchs
 History of Korea
 Gaya confederacy
 Three Kingdoms of Korea

Notes

References 

Gaya rulers
346 deaths
4th-century monarchs in Asia
3rd-century monarchs in Asia
Year of birth missing